Dobó is the name of a Hungarian noble family, and a surname. People with that name include:

 Ágnes Dobó (born 1988), Hungarian model and pageant titleholder
 István Dobó ( - 1572), Hungarian soldier
 Kata Dobó (born 1974), Hungarian actress
 George Devereux (born György Dobó) (1908-1985), Hungarian-French anthropologist

See also
 Dobó István Hungarian Elementary School, Slovakia
 Dobo (disambiguation)
 Dobos (surname)
 

Surnames of Hungarian origin